Kurapovo is a rural locality (a village) in Komyanskoye Rural Settlement, Gryazovetsky District, Vologda Oblast, Russia. The population was 5 as of 2002.

Geography 
Kurapovo is located 24 km north of Gryazovets (the district's administrative centre) by road. Khvastovo is the nearest rural locality.

References 

Rural localities in Gryazovetsky District